Josef Brian Baccay (born 29 April 2001) is a Norwegian professional footballer who plays as a leftback for Eliteserien club Odd.

Professional career
On 16 May 2018, Baccay signed his first professional contract with Lillestrøm. Baccay made his professional debut with Lillestrøm in a 2-0 Eliteserien loss to Molde FK on 22 April 2019.

International career
Baccay was born in Norway to a Filipino father and Norwegian mother. Baccay is a youth international for Norway.

References

External links
 
 Fotboll Profile
 LSK Profile

2001 births
Living people
Footballers from Oslo
Norwegian footballers
Norway youth international footballers
Norwegian people of Filipino descent
Association football fullbacks
Lillestrøm SK players
Fredrikstad FK players
Odds BK players
Eliteserien players
Norwegian Second Division players